Brachodes lucida is a moth of the family Brachodidae. It is found from Romania, Bulgaria, and the southern part of European Russia and Turkey to the eastern Palearctic realm.

References

Moths described in 1853
Brachodidae
Moths of Europe
Moths of Asia